The Devonshire Buildings are two adjacent apartment buildings in the Barrow Island area of Barrow-in-Furness, Cumbria, England.  They are both recorded in the National Heritage List for England as designated Grade II* listed buildings.

Constructed in the 1870s for the Barrow Iron Ship Building Company to house local shipyard workers, the buildings are nearly symmetrical and have octagonal towers at the end of each block. The buildings are similar to tenements in Glasgow, Scotland, which were inspired by housing in France.  Between 2008 and 2013 Devonshire Buildings were extensively refurbished by the Holker Group.

Similar tenements exist across Barrow Island, with those on Barque, Brig, Sloop and Steamer Streets also having listed building status. The Vickerstown estate on Walney Island was constructed between 1898 and 1901 in an effort to relieve overcrowding in the Barrow Island tenements, which had already seen some shipyard workers forced to live aboard the liner SS Alaska, which was moored in Barrow docks.

See also

 Listed buildings in Barrow-in-Furness
 List of non-ecclesiastical works by Paley and Austin
 Scotch Buildings

References

External links
 Official Holker Estate website

Buildings and structures in Barrow-in-Furness
Grade II* listed buildings in Cumbria
Paley and Austin buildings
Barrow-in-Furness port and shipyard